Provisor may refer to:

Occupation
 Majordomo
 holder of a canonical provision
 Assistant to a bishop; see vicar general

Surname
Ben Provisor (born 1990), American wrestler
Dennis Provisor (born 1943), American musician and songwriter
Leigh Jaynes (Leigh Jaynes Provisor), American wrestler

See also
 Provision (disambiguation)
 Proviso (disambiguation)

English-language surnames